Notes is a short romantic comedy film about a pair of roommates whose relationship develops through a series of post it notes. Notes marked the first installment of a trilogy of short films by Worrying Drake Productions. The film was also the directorial debut for John McPhail.

Plot
Adam (Tyler Collin) has just moved into a new flat with Abi (EmmaClaire Brightlyn) who is a nurse. The pair have never met and as a result of their conflicting sleep patterns the pair communicate via post it notes. What starts off as a complaint over their preferred types of coffee soon develops into flirtatious messages.

Main cast
Emma Claire Brightlyn as Abi 	
Tyler Collins as Adam
Ailsa Courtney as the Cleaner
Lynn Murray as Gemma
Dawn Robertson as Sarah
Jim Sweeney as the Landlord

Release and reception
Notes was released on 7 June 2013 and was positively received by critics. Thomas Simpson of MovieScramble wrote:  The film went on to appear in many domestic and international film festivals and picked up the Best Film accolade at the Edinburgh Bootleg Film Festival, as well as the audience award at the Palme Dewar festival in Aberfeldy.

Awards

References

External links
 
 Worry Drake Productions Website
 'Notes' Q&A at Write Shoot Cut – May 2013

Films set in Scotland
Films shot in Scotland
Scottish films
2013 films
English-language Scottish films
Films set in Glasgow
British independent films
2013 romantic comedy films
British romantic comedy films
2013 directorial debut films
2013 independent films
2010s English-language films
Films directed by John McPhail
2010s British films